Point Judith also known as Kingfisher Point is a geographic cape extending into Otsego Lake in the Town of Otsego north of Cooperstown, New York. Kingfisher Tower is located on the lake off Point Judith.

Originally it was called Two Mile Point, but the point's present name is derived from Judith Hutter from The Deerslayer.

References

Landforms of Otsego County, New York
Tourist attractions in Otsego County, New York